The Franklin Mountains of the Northwest Territories are a range of low peaks that stretch along the east bank of the Mackenzie River from 64 to 66 degrees of latitude.

References

Mountain ranges of the Northwest Territories